Manning Bowl was an American football and soccer stadium located in Lynn, Massachusetts. It was the home stadium for Lynn English, Lynn Classical, Lynn Tech, St. Mary's High School, the Boston Rovers of the United Soccer Association in 1967, and the Bay State Titans of the Minor League Football System in 1990. Demolished in 2005, it was replaced by Manning Field built at the same location.

High school football
Manning Bowl, a WPA project, opened on November 24, 1937 for the annual Thanksgiving Day football game between English and Classical. The stadium was not yet completed and was known only as Municipal Stadium. English defeated Classical 13-6 and Henry Pazik (father of future Major League pitcher Mike Pazik) scored the first touchdown in the stadium's history on a 33-yard pass play from Joe McNulty.

The stadium was completed on June 21, 1938 and named for mayor J. Fred Manning. The first football game held in the completed stadium was a night game between Peabody High School and Classical with Peabody winning 27-7.

In 1948, the city of Lynn became the first to televise high school football, in an arrangement with WNAC-TV in Boston.

The Harry Agganis All-Star Football Classic was played at Manning Bowl from 1956–1959 and again from 1965-2003.

The final game played at Manning Bowl was on November 25, 2004 and was the annual Thanksgiving Day game between English and Classical. English won the game 28-8. The final touchdown in Manning Bowl history was scored by Mike Orfanos on a 2-yard run.

Notable high school athletes who played at the Manning Bowl
 Bill Adams, offensive lineman, Swampscott High School
 Harry Agganis, Kicker/Halfback, Lynn Classical
 Mark Bavaro, tight end, Danvers High School
 Matt Bloom, offensive line, Peabody High School
 Billy Conigliaro, running back, Swampscott High School
 Tony Conigliaro, quarterback, St. Mary's High School
 Boley Dancewicz, Quarterback, Lynn Classical
 Joe DiVito, quarterback, St. Mary's
 Richard Fecteau, lineman, Lynn Classical
 Jim Hegan, Lynn English
 Dick Jauron, Safety, Swampscott High School
 Greg Landry, quarterback, Nashua (NH) High School
 Steve Lomasney, quarterback, Peabody High School
 Doug Mackie, offensive line, Saugus High School
 Mike Pazik, quarterback, Lynn English
 Art Spinney, guard, Saugus High School
 Lou Tsioropoulos, kicker/tight end/defensive end, Lynn English

Professional football
On September 18, 1945, the Boston Yanks defeated the defending National Football League champion New York Giants 14-3 in an exhibition game at the Manning Bowl. The game was only attended by 8,500 due to poor weather. The Yanks returned to the Manning Bowl the following season for "Boley Dancewicz Night", which honored Yanks quarterback and Lynn native Frank "Boley" Dancewicz. The Yanks defeated the Long Island Indians of the American Football League 27-0 in front of 10,000 spectators. At halftime, Dancewicz was presented with a radio, watch, and a pen and pencil by Mayor Albert Cole.

In 1959, the Chicago Bears defeated the Philadelphia Eagles 24-21 in the Cardinal Cushing Charity Game. Future Hall of Fame quarterback Norm Van Brocklin started for Philadelphia.

The Boston Breakers of the United States Football League considered moving to the manning bowl after 1983 season, however the team moved to New Orleans instead.

The semi-pro Bay State Titans played their only season here. Defensive Tackle Eric Swann would be selected with the 6th overall pick in the 1991 NFL Draft.

College football
The first college football game in the Manning Bowl was a 1953 contest between Holy Cross and Dartmouth.

Concerts
The Rolling Stones kicked off their 1966 North American Tour at the stadium on June 24, 1966. Police cut the event short in response to crowd surge toward the stage.

On June 11, 1976, Ray Charles held a charity concert to raise money for the Life Institute for Blind. The Four Tops and Dorothy Moore also performed.

Mötley Crüe drew 15,000 fans during an August 1985 concert, Accept and Y & T were on the bill, as were Helix (Helix did not perform). It was known as Summer Jam 85.

Aerosmith performed at the stadium during their Done with Mirrors Tour on September 14, 1985.

The Beach Boys performed at the Stadium September 23, 1984.

The Kinks performed at the Stadium September 8, 1985.

Other events
The first official event held at the Manning Bowl was a citywide dance held on a specially made dance area in the end zone. This area was also used to show night time movies during the 1930s and '40s.

The Manning Bowl hosted memorials following the deaths of Presidents Franklin D. Roosevelt and John F. Kennedy.

From 1966 to 1982, The Manning Bowl was home to Drum & Bugle Corps World Open Championship.

The Manning Bowl was the home stadium for the Boston Rovers during the United Soccer Association's only season. The league's first ever game was held here and ended in a 1-1 draw against the Detroit Cougars. Mick Leech scoring for Rovers.

The first ever Agganis All-Star Basketball Game was played here in 1976.

In 1985, the Manning Bowl hosted 2 World Class Championship Wrestling Events

In 1978, Eddie Feigner hurled one of his 930 no-hitters in a game played on makeshift diamond.

References

External links
Stadium information

Defunct American football venues in Massachusetts
Defunct soccer venues in Massachusetts
Buildings and structures in Lynn, Massachusetts
Sports in Lynn, Massachusetts